"Dare Me" is a 1985 song originally by American contemporary R&B group the Pointer Sisters, issued by RCA Records.

The Pointer Sisters version

Background
"Dare Me" was written by Nashville-based songwriters Sam Lorber and Dave Innis in 1984. Innis, who shortly afterwards became a founding member of Restless Heart, was then a staff writer for Warner Bros. music publishing division, and recalls that "Dare Me" was written with the Pointer Sisters in mind, adding: "typically [staff writers] look at who's [recording] now and what kind of material are they looking for, and we would tailor a song for a particular artist and pitch it"..."Sam Lorber and I...did try to put ourselves in the place of what a gal might be thinking...not specifically trying to be a Pointer Sister, but a song written from a female perspective, for sure. There are certain things that are more gender specific and gender appropriate...certain things that a woman can say that a guy's not going to be able to get away with saying."

Featuring a lead vocal by June Pointer, "Dare Me" was issued as the lead single from the Pointer Sisters' platinum-selling album Contact: peaking at number 11 on the Hot 100 in Billboard magazine, "Dare Me" did afford the Pointer Sisters a final Top Ten hit on the magazine's R&B chart peaking at number 6 and also became the only Pointer Sisters' track to reach number 1 on Billboards Dance Club chart. "Dare Me" afforded the Pointer Sisters their final Top 40 hit in the British Isles with peaks of number 7 in Ireland and number 17 in the UK: other international chart peaks for "Dare Me" were number 10 in Australia, number 20 in Canada, number 22 in Austria, number 20 in Belgium (the Flemish chart), number 26 in Finland, number 45 in the Netherlands, number 27 in New Zealand, and number 11 in Sweden.

Video
"Dare Me" was promoted with a video shot at the Main Street Gym (LA) where scenes for the iconic martial arts film Raging Bull had been filmed: the video introduced the Pointer Sisters in male drag scouting potential boxing talent, then showed the group's members in the boxing ring sparring with Mark Breland. Michael Chapman, the cinematographer for Raging Bull, directed the "Dare Me" video in collaboration with the track's producer Richard Perry: the video also featured Steven Bauer.

The Casey Kasem incident
In September 1985, while the Pointer Sisters' version was on the Billboard Hot 100 music chart, American Top 40 host Casey Kasem became irritated when the show's producers placed a long distance dedication spot about a listener's dog dying immediately after "Dare Me," which was an uptempo dance song. The song in the dedication was Henry Gross' "Shannon". Kasem expressed his dissatisfaction with a profanity-laced tirade which never made the air, but has become a staple on the Internet.

Junior Jack version

"Stupidisco" is a 2004 single by Italian-Belgian house music producer Junior Jack. It topped the Billboard Dance Club Songs chart and peaked at number 25 in the Netherlands, number 26 in the United Kingdom, and number 46 in Australia. In 2006, the song was re-released as "Dare Me  (Stupidisco)", featuring vocals from Shena. This version reached number 14 in Finland and number 20 in the United Kingdom. Both versions topped the UK Dance Chart.

Music video
There is a censored version and an uncensored version of the music video. The video itself features two female wrestlers. In both versions, towards the end, both women make sexual motions. In the uncensored version, they pull off each other's bikinis while wrestling. They fondle each other and dance naked until the song ends.

The video also features two Pakistani American announcers; one of them is the businessman Mansoor Ijaz. He had a cameo role in the music video as an announcer. His participation in the music video was used to undermine Ijaz during the memogate controversy in Pakistan.

Charts

"Stupidisco"Weekly chartsYear-end charts'

"Dare Me (Stupidisco)"

Samples and other covers
 Dave Armstrong's song "Make Your Move", samples this track and is similar to Junior Jack's version.
 In 2020, Nervo, Plastik Funk and Tim Morrison released a cover version of "Dare Me".

References

1985 singles
1985 songs
2004 singles
The Pointer Sisters songs
Nervo (DJs) songs
RCA Records singles
Song recordings produced by Richard Perry
Songs with feminist themes
Songs written by Sam Lorber